Robert Lyons may refer to:

Robert Fern Lyons (1856–1926), Manitoba politician
Robert F. Lyons (actor) (born 1939), American actor
Robert Llewellyn Lyons (born 1948), Saskatchewan politician
Robert Dyer Lyons (1826–1886), Irish physician
Robert Lyons (American football) (born 1935), American football coach, Northeastern University
Robert Lyons (writer) (born 1959), playwright, director
Robbie Lyons (1972–2003), murderer
Robert Lyons (Australian politician) (1849–1892), member of the Queensland Legislative Assembly
Robert T. Lyons (1873–?), architect in New York City

See also
Robert Lyon (disambiguation)